Qin Hong (1426–1505) was a politician of the Ming dynasty.

He achieved the jinshi degree and entered the imperial government in 1451. He served as Governor of Shanxi Province from 1476 to 1479, and Viceroy of Liangguang from 1489 to 1495.

In 1501, Qin was appointed Governor of Military Affairs at the three border prefectures; this post would be a precursor to the Viceroy of Shaan-Gan. He was then appointed head of the Ministry of Revenue in 1504, but declined the appointment due to old age and retired from the civil service.

1426 births
1505 deaths
Ming dynasty politicians
Politicians from Jining
Viceroys of Liangguang
Viceroys of Shaan-Gan